Philip Crowley may refer to:

 Philip Crowley (businessman) (1903–1977), English businessman
 Philip Crowley (entomologist) (1837–1900), English entomologist
 Philip J. Crowley (born 1951), spokesman for the United States State Department